The National Archives of Spain is a national system of Archives and State Centers maintained by the Archive (Archivo) department of the Spanish Ministry of Culture.

Collections 
The National Archives of Spain consists of a number of different collections. The four main branches of the National Archives of Spain include the General Archive of the Indies in Seville, the National Historical Archives in Madrid and elsewhere, the General Administrative Archives in Alcala de Henares, and the General Archive of Simancas. The General Administrative Archives, Alcala de Henares, is a repository for the records of the ministries of the central administration, created in 1969 as a replacement for the Central Archive, which was destroyed in a fire in 1939. The General Archive of Simancas, established in 1540, now serves as a historical archive.

Other Archives and Centers include:

 Archive of the Crown of Aragon
 Archive of the Royal Chancery of Valladolid
 Documentary Center of Historical Memory
 Historical Archive of the Nobility
 Central Archive of Culture
 Central Archive of the Secretary of State for Education
 Archives Documentary Information Center (CIDA)
 Document Reproduction Service (SRDAE)

Related Networks 
The "Portal de Archivos Españoles" (PARES), is the open access database for the digitized records of the various collections within the National Archives. This project is run in conjunction by the Ministry of Culture and Sport and the Ministry of Education and Vocational Training.

References 

 Franks, Patricia C. and Anthony Bernier. (2018). The International Directory of National Archives. Lanham: Rowman & Littlefield. p. 355-357. 
“Archives and State Centers managed by the Ministry of Culture.” Ministry of Culture and Sports. Retrieved 2018-11-27

External links
Site of the Archives Department of the Spanish Ministry of Culture

Archives in Spain
Spain
Spanish culture